Ahlstrom, Ahlström, or Åhlström may refer to:

People
Ahlström family, Finnish industrialists who founded the Ahlstrom Corporation, including:
Antti Ahlström (1827–1896), founder of the Ahlstrom Corporation
Maire Ahlström (1907–1990), art collector and co-founder of the Artek furniture company
Anders Ahlström (born 1948), Swedish footballer and football manager
Anna Ahlström (1863–1943), Swedish teacher, principal, school founder
Jacob Niclas Ahlström (1805–1857), Swedish composer
Kattis Ahlström (born 1966), Swedish journalist and TV presenter
Lavern Ahlstrom, politician and former leader of the Alberta Social Credit Party
Olof Åhlström (1756–1835), Swedish civil servant, composer and music publisher
Oscar Ahlström (born 1986), Swedish professional ice hockey player
Sydney E. Ahlstrom (1919–1984), American educator and historian
Thomas Ahlström (born 1952), former Swedish footballer
Tom Ahlström, one of the founders of A&E Design
Victor Ahlström (born 1986), Swedish professional ice hockey player
Vilma Åhlström, Swedish curler

Other
Ahlstrom, now Ahlstrom-Munksjö, an international company that produces fiber-based materials
Alhambra/Ahlstrom Aerodrome, in Alhambra, Alberta, Canada